Schweiz 5 is a privately owned TV channel in German-speaking Switzerland.

Programming

References

External links
 

Television stations in Switzerland
Television channels and stations established in 2004
2004 establishments in Switzerland
German-language television stations
Mass media in Aarburg